Hoseynabad (also Romanized as Ḩoseynābād and Hosein Abad; also known as Husainābād) is a village in Kuri Rural District, in the Central District of Jam County, Bushehr Province, Iran. At the 2006 census, its population was 173, in 42 families.

References 

Populated places in Jam County